A contradiction is a logical incompatibility between two or more propositions

Contradiction may also refer to:

 Contradiction (album), a 1976 album by The Ohio Players
 Contradictions, a 1999 album by One Gud Cide
 Contradiction: Spot the Liar!, a 2015 detective FMV game by Tim Follin

See also

 Contradictions of the bible
 Contradictories, or the square of opposition
 Proof by contradiction
 Paradox